The 2019–20 Elite One was the 60th season of the Elite One, the top-tier football league in Cameroon. This was the first season in the Elite One to use an October–May schedule since the 2011–12 season, it was changed so as to conform with the new CAF calendar.

The season started on 18 October 2019 and was scheduled to end on 26 April 2020, but due to the effects of the COVID-19 pandemic, the season was cancelled on 12 May 2020 by FECAFOOT.
PWD Bamenda won their first Elite One silverware as they were crowned champions, alongside Coton Sport, they will represent Cameroon at the 2020–21 CAF Champions League and CAF Confederation Cup respectively as the Cameroonian Cup won't hold this year. Only Dragon Club were relegated to the Elite Two as the teams would be increased to twenty  teams during the next season.
There were no Championship and Relegation group this season.

Teams
Eighteen teams competed in the league, the top 15 teams from the previous season and the three promoted teams from the Elite Two (Bamboutos FC, Canon Sportif and Panthère du Ndé) while (PWD Bamenda, New Star de Douala and Unisport FC de Bafang) relegated from the previous season after finishing last at the playoffs. PWD Bamenda later replaced Les Astres FC.

Coton Sport FC were the defending champions.

Note: Table lists in alphabetical order.

Locations of teams

League table

Results

See also
 2019–20 Nigeria Professional Football League

References

External links
 Elite One 2019–20 at FECAFOOT officiel
 Cameroon 2019–20, at RSSF.com

Elite One seasons
Cameroon
Cameroon
Cameroon